Jaanus Männik (born 3 May 1951 in Põltsamaa) is an Estonian politician. He has been member of VIII, IX and X Riigikogu.

He was a member of People's Union of Estonia. In September 2007, he became the mayor of Are Parish. On 7 March 2011 he became mayor of Surju Parish.

References

1951 births
Living people
People's Union of Estonia politicians
Members of the Riigikogu, 1995–1999
Members of the Riigikogu, 1999–2003
Members of the Riigikogu, 2003–2007
Mayors of places in Estonia
Estonian University of Life Sciences alumni
Recipients of the Order of the White Star, 4th Class
People from Põltsamaa